Kaimo Kuusk (born 5 December 1975), is an Estonian diplomat and foreign intelligence officer. Since 11 July 2019, he has been the  Estonian ambassador to Ukraine.

Early life and education
Kaimo Kuusk was born in Abja-Paluoja. He attended secondary school at the Hugo Treffner Gymnasium in Tartu. He is a 1998 graduate of the Faculty of Social Sciences of the University of Tartu.

Career
Kuusk began his career employed at the Estonian Foreign Intelligence Service (VLA). He was head of the department from 1998 until 2008, and Deputy Director General from 2008 until 2019. In 2019, he was appointed the Advisor of the Eastern Europe and Central Asia Bureau of the Estonian Ministry of Foreign Affairs. On 11 July 2019, he was appointed as the Ambassador Extraordinary and Plenipotentiary of the Republic of Estonia to Ukraine, succeeding Gert Antsu. He arrived in Kyiv for his position on 1 August, and on 11 September 2019, he presented President of Ukraine Volodymyr Zelenskyy his credentials and reaffirmed Estonia's continued support for the sovereignty and territorial integrity of Ukraine.

Personal life
Kuusk played football for Tallinn football club FC Toompea, retiring in 2014.

Acknowledgement
Order of the White Star, V Class (2006)  
Cross of Merit, I Class (2022)

References

1975 births
Living people
Estonian diplomats
Ambassadors of Estonia to Ukraine
Recipients of the Order of the White Star, 5th Class
Hugo Treffner Gymnasium alumni
University of Tartu alumni
People from Abja-Paluoja